This is a list of the mammal species recorded in Guam. There are fifteen mammal species in and around Guam, of which two are endangered and one is considered to be extinct.

The following tags are used to highlight each species' conservation status as assessed by the International Union for Conservation of Nature:

Order: Chiroptera (bats) 
The bats' most distinguishing feature is that their forelimbs are developed as wings, making them the only mammals capable of flight. Bat species account for about 20% of all mammals.

Family: Pteropodidae (flying foxes, Old World fruit bats)
Subfamily: Pteropodinae
Genus: Pteropus
 Mariana fruit bat, Pteropus mariannus 
 Guam flying fox, Pteropus tokudae 
Family: Emballonuridae
Genus: Emballonura
 Polynesian sheath-tailed bat, Emballonura semicaudata  (extirpated from Guam)

Order: Cetacea (whales) 

The order Cetacea includes whales, dolphins and porpoises. They are the mammals most fully adapted to aquatic life with a spindle-shaped nearly hairless body, protected by a thick layer of blubber, forelimbs, and tails modified to provide propulsion underwater.

Suborder: Mysticeti
Family: Balaenopteridae
Subfamily: Balaenopterinae
Genus: Balaenoptera
 Sei whale, Balaenoptera borealis 
 Bryde's whale, Balaenoptera edeni 
Subfamily: Megapterinae
Genus: Megaptera
 Humpback whale, Megaptera novaeangliae 
Suborder: Odontoceti
Family: Physeteridae
Genus: Physeter
 Sperm whale, Physeter macrocephalus 
Superfamily: Platanistoidea
Family: Kogiidae
Genus: Kogia
 Dwarf sperm whale, Kogia sima 
Family: Ziphidae
Subfamily: Hyperoodontinae
Genus: Mesoplodon
 Blainville's beaked whale, Mesoplodon densirostris 
Family: Delphinidae (marine dolphins)
Genus: Lagenodelphis
 Fraser's dolphin, Lagenodelphis hosei 
Genus: Peponocephala
 Melon-headed whale, Peponocephala electra 
Genus: Feresa
 Pygmy killer whale, Feresa attenuata 
Genus: Pseudorca
 False killer whale, Pseudorca crassidens 
Genus: Globicephala
 Short-finned pilot whale, Globicephala macrorhynchus 
Genus: Orcinus
 Orca, Orcinus orca

See also
List of chordate orders
Lists of mammals by region
List of prehistoric mammals
Mammal classification
List of mammals described in the 2000s

Notes

References
 

Guam
Lists of biota of Guam
Guam
Fauna of Guam